The Fourth War is a 1990 American cold war drama film directed by John Frankenheimer. It is set in West Germany of the late 1980s, and was filmed in Alberta, Canada. It stars Roy Scheider and Jürgen Prochnow as two military men whose personal dispute threatens to escalate into a larger conflict.

Plot

Colonel Jack Knowles (Roy Scheider) is a tough, professional soldier who was decorated for gallantry in Vietnam. The same gung ho mentality that made Knowles a hero in wartime makes him a dangerous loose cannon in peacetime. He is stationed at an outpost on the West German-Czechoslovakia border and immediately gets into a dangerous personal war with his Soviet counterpart Colonel Valachev. The two men ironically have many of the same characteristics. Knowles is enraged when he has to stand by as a would be refugee is shot on the border and immediately begins crossing the border on dangerous solo missions to sabotage the enemy installations. Knowles comes into conflict with his by the book second-in-command Lieutenant Colonel Clark, and Knowles' superior, General Hackworth, angrily orders him to desist, but to no avail. The petty war between the two men threatens to escalate into a full scale conflict as they engage in hand-to-hand combat on a frozen lake with their countries' armies on both sides ready to begin a full scale war. Knowles only relents at the last moment to avoid the conflict.

Cast
 Roy Scheider as Colonel Jack Knowles
 Jürgen Prochnow as Colonel Valachev
 Tim Reid as Lieutenant Colonel Clark
 Lara Harris as Elena
 Harry Dean Stanton as General Hackworth
 Dale Dye as Sergeant Major

Production
The story was based on an original concept by a Los Angeles writer, Stephen Peters. The script was rewritten and updated by Kenneth Ross, who had previously worked with Frankenheimer. 
The title comes from a famous quote by Albert Einstein: "I know not with what weapons World War III will be fought, but World War IV will be fought with sticks and stones." 
Frankenheimer and Scheider, both antiwar advocates, were not happy with the working title, and other titles such as Game of Honor and Face Off were discussed.

Filming took place in Alberta, Canada. It was shot over ten weeks, in locations near where the 1988 Winter Olympics had been held. After unusually warm weather in 1988 there were concerns that the snow would not hold and they would need to create artificial snow instead but during filming in February temperatures in southern Alberta dropped to 40 below zero which caused some difficulties. 
During a fight scene, Scheider cracked a rib and Prochnow dislocated his knee.

Reception
On Rotten Tomatoes the film has an approval rating of 64% based on reviews from 11 critics. 
On Metacritic the film has a score of 57% based on reviews from 15 critics, indicating "mixed or average reviews".

Variety called it "a well-made Cold War thriller" and praised the casting, as well as Frankenheimer's direction for having "an eye for comic relief as well as tension maintenance".
Roger Ebert of the Chicago Sun-Times gave it 3 out of 4 and wrote: "The Fourth War is essentially a psychological study of a man coming apart at the hinges." Entertainment Weekly'''s Owen Gleiberman gave it a B- and wrote: "The Fourth War is an old-soldiers-never-die movie — an ironic elegy — and though much of the story is contrived and second-rate, Scheider gives a richly felt performance." Michael Wilmington of the Los Angeles Times'' wrote: "The Fourth War doesn't make much sense, but it's powerfully acted and beautifully directed."

References

External links
 

1990 films
Cold War films
1990s English-language films
Films scored by Bill Conti
Films directed by John Frankenheimer
1990 drama films
American drama films
Golan-Globus films
Films set in West Germany
Films set in Czechoslovakia
Films shot in Alberta
1990s American films